Pohénégamook, Quebec (pop. 2940) is a Canadian town on the Canada–United States border in Quebec's Témiscouata Regional County Municipality.

The town shares the border with Estcourt Station, Maine, the northernmost point in New England.

As of 2006, Pohénégamook had 2940 people, down 5.1% from the last census in 2001.

The town is named after Lake Pohenegamook and is located on the lake's southern and western shores.

History

Pohénégamook was amalgamated with the formerly-independent communities of Saint-Pierre d'Estcourt, Saint-Éleuthère, Village-Blier and Saint-David-de-Sully on October 23, 1973.

Demographics 

Recreation
Parc de la Frontière, located along the southern lakeshore of Lake Pohenegamook, straddles the U.S.-Canadian border. It features a historic marker and gives visitors the experience of visiting a park in two countries.

See also
 Lake Pohenegamook, a waterbody
 Boucanée River, a stream
 List of cities in Quebec

References

External links
 
 http://www.pohenegamook.net (Pohenegamook official website)

Cities and towns in Quebec
Incorporated places in Bas-Saint-Laurent
Canada geography articles needing translation from French Wikipedia